A gubernatorial election was held on 7 April 2019 to elect the next governor of Shimane.

Candidates 
 - president of the  Shimane Prefecture Headquarters, candidate for Matsue mayor in 2017, a native of Okayama City, and alumnus of the Shimane University Faculty of Election, age 57. Recommended by the Japanese Communist Party. Her candidacy was announced on 20 February 2019.
Tatsuya Maruyama - former Civil Protection Manager of the Fire and Disaster Management Agency, a native of Hirokawa, Fukuoka and alumnus of the University of Tokyo Faculty of Law, age 49. His candidacy was announced on 17 January 2019.
 - native of and former mayor of Yasugi, Shimane and alumnus of Kanagawa Dental University, age 65. His candidacy was announced on 4 February.
 - former deputy director of the Fire and Disaster Management Agency, a native of Matsue, Shimane, and alumnus of the University of Tokyo Faculty of Engineering, age 59. His candidacy was announced on 18 January 2019.
, a former city councillor at Hamada, Shimane, announced his candidacy, but was not listed among the four candidates.

Results

References 

2019 elections in Japan
Gubernatorial elections in Japan
Politics of Shimane Prefecture